Braidbar Boats are a narrowboat building company based at Lord Vernon’s Wharf on the Macclesfield Canal at Poynton, Cheshire.

Company history
In 1983 Braidbar Boats was established as a narrowboat building business in Lord Vernon’s Wharf on the Macclesfield Canal at Poynton, Cheshire. The company produces around 7 quality narrowboats each year and has won many awards, including Favourite Boat in Show at the Crick Boat Show in 2000, 2007 and 2018.

Lord Vernon’s Wharf
Lord Vernon’s Wharf was constructed as a short arm to the Macclesfield Canal in 1831 shortly after the canal was completed for use by the Poynton Collieries which was owned by the Baron Vernon from 1832 until 1935. In the late 1950s the site was used by Constellation Cruises who started with a 70ft boat which had 7-8 berths.

References

Companies established in 1983
Companies based in Cheshire
Narrowboat builders